Bavil-e Olya (also Romanized as Bāvīl-e ‘Olyā) is a village in Bavil Rural District, in the Central District of Osku County, East Azerbaijan Province, Iran. At the 2006 census, its population was 542, in 189 families.

References 

Populated places in Osku County